Preserver is a novel by William Shatner, co-written with Judith and Garfield Reeves-Stevens, based upon the television series Star Trek. The novel was released in 2000 in hardcover format. This is the conclusion of a trilogy that began with Spectre and Dark Victory.

Synopsis
Kirk's Mirror Universe double has risen to power as the evil Emperor Tiberius. This alternate universe version has failed in his quest to learn the secrets of the advanced 'First Federation'. Tiberius tries to intervene in Kirk's universe to learn the secrets of its version of the First. To complicate matters, Kirk's wife Teilani is deathly ill, a situation Tiberius gleefully takes advantage of in order to secure Kirk's assistance.

References

External links

 Preserver on Goodreads.com

2001 American novels
Novels based on Star Trek: The Original Series
Novels based on Star Trek: The Next Generation
Novels by William Shatner
Novels by Judith and Garfield Reeves-Stevens